Theocridini is a tribe of longhorn beetles of the subfamily Lamiinae. It was described by Thomson in 1858.

Taxonomy
 Aplanodema Téocchi, 2000
 Cyrtocris Aurivillius, 1903
 Paradocus Breuning, 1950
 Paratheocris Breuning, 1938
 Planodema Thomson, 1860
 Setodocus Breuning, 1968
 Theocris Thomson, 1858
 Trichodocus Breuning, 1939

References

 
Lamiinae